Nastia is a genus of air-breathing land snails, terrestrial gastropod mollusks in the family Oxychilidae.

Nastia is the type genus of the subfamily Nastiinae, which is a synonym of Oxychilinae.

Distribution 
Distribution of Nastia include north-eastern Turkey.

Species
Species within the genus Nastia include:
 Nastia viridula Riedel, 1989 - type species

References 

Oxychilidae